Pascal Anicet (born March 27, 1983 in Niger) is a Nigerian football midfielder who plays for AS-FNIS in the Niger Premier League and formerly for Alkali Nassara Zinder. He is a member of the Niger national football team, he was member with the team by Tournoi de l'UEMOA 2007.

External links

FIFA Profile

1983 births
Living people
Nigerien footballers
Association football midfielders
AS GNN players
Niger international footballers